Bałucianka  (Balutianka) is a village in the administrative district of Gmina Rymanów, within Krosno County, Subcarpathian Voivodeship, in south-eastern Poland.

References

Villages in Krosno County